is a Japanese tarento, model, and actress. She is a former member of the Japanese female idol group AKB48, and was in Team A.

She was also a member, along with her good friends Anna Iriyama and Rina Kawaei, of a one-shot AKB48 subunit named AnRiRe. Formed in 2012, the trio released their first and only single "Ikujinashi Masquerade" with Rino Sashihara from HKT48, charting at number one in Japan.

Biography 
Kato was born on July 10, 1997, in Chiba Prefecture, Japan. As a child, she appeared in many magazines as a model, and subsequently joined AKB48, aspiring to become a famous model someday. She joined AKB48 to pursue that dream, with the encouragement of her friends.

Kato participated in the 10th-generation auditions held by AKB48, and joined as a kenkyuusei trainee in March 2010. She officially participated on AKB48 singles on Chance no Junban's coupling song, titled "Fruits Snow", as part of Team Kenkyusei. On December 17, 2011, Rena Katō, together with two other members of AKB48, Ami Maeda and Anna Iriyama, held a large autograph-signing event in Hong Kong.

At the end of 2011, while still an AKB48 trainee, she appeared on the cover of the Japanese magazine Weekly Playboy with seven other top members of AKB48 and SKE48. It was the last issue of 2011. In 2012, she participated in the AKB48 drama Majisuka Gakuen 3, which was a sequel to the series, but with a different storyline completely unrelated to the previous adaptations. She was also promoted to Team 4 on March 23, 2012. Soon after the TV series Shiritsu Bakaleya Kōkō ended on June 30, 2012, it was announced that Rena Katō would participate in its film adaptation. The series and movie starred several Johnny's Jr. and AKB48 members. She participated on her very first A-side in AKB48 on the summer single titled "Manatsu No Sounds Good!".

She was transferred to Team B after the AKB48 Tokyo Dome Shuffle on August 24, 2012, where her then-team, the first version of Team 4, was disbanded. In 2013, she participated on her second A-side in AKB48 on the summer single "Sayonara Crawl", which included 38 members. She got her very first center song in "Heart Electric", the 33rd single's B-side, "Kaisoku To Dotai Shiryoku", as the center of Undergirls, a duo center with SKE48 member Suda Akari. On 2014, she got a knee injury and had to temporarily postpone her AKB48 activities, as a result, she was not able to participate in the Unit Matsuri 2014, as well as the AKB48 Request Hour Set List Best 200, except on the final day. Even with an injury, she and Yuki Kashiwagi held a large autograph-signing and handshake event in Hong Kong with thousands of fans. She resumed her activities on February 16, 2014. She was transferred back to Team 4 during the AKB48 Group Daisokaku Matsuri. She joined the Senbatsu for the third time in the 37th single's A-side, titled "Labrador Retriever", released on May 21, 2014. On March 26, 2015, she was transferred back to team B in AKB48 Spring Shuffle 2015 event.

From 2015 to 2017, Kato held annual contests called , inspired by the AKB48 Group's Senbatsu Sōsenkyo. It started when Kato made a list of her favorite members on social media at her fans' request, but received the approval of Yasushi Akimoto shortly after and eventually became an official event. Every year, AKB48 Group members can apply for the opportunity to take part in singles, photoshoots, and theatrical productions organized by her. Despite the name, the winners are decided by Kato and her team instead of by election.

On December 16, 2021, during a YouTube livestream, Kato announced her graduation from AKB48 to pursue a career as a beautician. Her last theater performance was on February 14, 2022, and her final group activity was on February 20. She states that she will continue performing arts activities while pursuing cosmetology.

Her official fanclub, "Rena's dresser", was launched on March 1, 2022, 9 days after graduating from AKB48.

Discography

Singles

With AKB48

Albums

With AKB48

With Sashihara Rino with Anrire 
 Ikujinashi Masquerade (October 17, 2012)

Chart performance

Stage units 
Team Kenkyūusei 4th Stage "Theater no Megami"
 
Team B 5th Stage "Theater no Megami"
 
Team K 6th Stage "Reset"
 
Team A 5th Stage "Mokugekisha"
 
Team 4 1st Stage "Boku No Taiyo"
 
Team B Waiting Stage
 
Team 4 3rd Stage "Idol No Yoake"

Appearances

Movies 
 Gekijōban Shiritsu Bakaleya Kōkō (October 13, 2012)
 Nidome no Natsu, Nidoto Aenai Kimi (September 1, 2017)
 Tsujiura Renbo (May 21, 2022)

TV dramas 
 Majisuka Gakuen 2 (Final episode, July 1, 2011, TV Tokyo) - Rena
 Majisuka Gakuen 3 (Episode 2 — final episode, July 20 — October 5, 2012, TV Tokyo) - Shokkaku
 So Long! (Team B episode - February 13, 2013, TV Tokyo) - Yuka
 Majisuka Gakuen 4 (Episode 1 — final episode, January 19 — March 30, 2015, Nippon Television) - Dodobusu
 Majisuka Gakuen 5 (Episode 1 — final episode, August 24 — October 27, 2015, Nippon Television, Hulu) - Dodobusu
AKB Horror Night: Adrenaline's Night Ep.23 - There's, Another One (2015) - Shōko
Kyabasuka Gakuen (Episode 5 — final episode, December 4, 2015 — January 4, 2016, Nippon Television) - Dodobusu
Tofu Pro Wrestling (January 22 — July 2, 2016, TV Asahi) - Cutie Renacchi

Variety shows 
 AKBingo! (April 2, 2011 - 2021, TV Tokyo)
 Shukan AKB (June 1, 2011 - May 25, 2012, TV Tokyo)
 Ariyoshi AKB Kyowakoku (January 20, 2011 - March 29, 2016, TBS)
 AKB Nemousu TV (Season 8 - 9, Family Gekijo)
|-
| 27

 AKB Konto, Bimyo (October 20, 2011 - November 3, 2011, Hikari TV Channel)
 AKB48 to Chome Chome! (Yomiuri TV)
 AKB48 no Anta, Dare? (NotTV)
 AKB Kousagi Dojo (December 7, 2012 - March 28, 2014, TV Tokyo)
 Saturday Night Child Machine (April 13, 2013 - June 29, 2013, TV Tokyo)
 AKB Kanko Taishi (April 10, 2014, FujiTV)

References

External links 
  
 Rena Kato on Twitter
 Rena Kato on Instagram

1997 births
Living people
AKB48 members
Japanese idols
People from Chiba Prefecture
Sony Music Entertainment Japan artists
Musicians from Chiba Prefecture
21st-century Japanese women singers
21st-century Japanese singers
21st-century Japanese actresses